Escobal is a district of the Atenas canton, in the Alajuela province of Costa Rica.

History 
Escobal was created on 8 March 2004 by Decreto Ejecutivo 31653-G.

Geography 
Escobal has an area of  km² and an elevation of  metres.

Demographics 

For the 2011 census, Escobal had a population of  inhabitants.

Transportation

Road transportation 
The district is covered by the following road routes:
 National Route 27
 National Route 707

References 

Districts of Alajuela Province
Populated places in Alajuela Province